The Rheinmetall RMG 7.62 is a machine gun under development by Rheinmetall Defence. The weapon comes with 3 rotating barrels to reduce overheating and erosion during a firefight.

Overview
The RMG 7.62 is a development of the MG3, intended as a vehicle mounted weapon where changing the overheated barrel would be a problem. Like the MG3, it is a recoil operated weapon that fires at about 800rpm and uses the belt feed from the MG3. The weapon comes with a cluster of 3 barrels that change over when overheated leaving the previously lined up barrel to cool off. This is not a rotary weapon like a Minigun, although it has the appearance of one externally.

See also
 List of multiple-barrel firearms

References

7.62×51mm NATO machine guns
Machine guns of Germany
Medium machine guns
Post–Cold War weapons of Germany
RMG 7.62
Multi-barrel machine guns